Opęchowo  is a village in the administrative district of Gmina Troszyn, within Ostrołęka County, Masovian Voivodeship, in east-central Poland. The climate is cold and temperate with a great deal of rainfall – even in the driest month.

References

Villages in Ostrołęka County